Events from the year 1995 in Denmark.

Incumbents
 Monarch – Margrethe II
 Prime minister – Poul Nyrup Rasmussen

Events

Undated
 Thulegate, a political scandal regarding the government's tacit approval of the storage of nuclear weapons in Greenland in contravention of Denmark's nuclear free zone.

The arts

Film
 March 22 - The Dogma 95 movement is launched at Le cinéma vers son deuxième siècle conference in Paris, where the cinema world gathered to celebrate the first century of motion pictures and contemplate the uncertain future of commercial cinema.

Literature

Music

Sports

Badminton
 Lillerød BK wins the Europe Cup.
 1418 March  Poul-Erik Høyer Larsen wins gold in men's single and Thomas Lund and Marlene Thomsen wins gold in mixed double at the 1995 All England Open Badminton Championships.
 2228 May  Denmark wins one gold medal, one silver medal and two bronze medals at the 1995 IBF World Championships.

Cycling
 April — Lars Michaelsen wins the Gent–Wevelgem road cycling race in Belgium.
 July 23 — Bjarne Riis finishes 3rd in the 1995 Tour de France.
 October 18 — Rolf Sørensen finishes second in the Milano–Torino road cycling race.
 Danny Clark (AUS) and Jimmi Madsen (DEN) win the Six Days of Copenhagen sox-day track cycling race.

Football
 25 May  F.C. Copenhagen wins the 1994–95 Danish Cup by defeating AB 50 in the final.
 6 September — Denmark qualifies for UEFA Euro 1996 by defeating Armenia 3–1 in their last match in Group 2 of the UEFA Euro 1996 qualifying.

Swimming
 22 Denmark wins two gold medals, two silver medals and two bronze medals at the 1995 European Aquatics Championships.

Other
 7 August — Wilson Kipketer wins gold in Men's 800 metres at the 1995 World Championships in Athletics.
 21 August — Erik Gundersen wins the 1985 Individual Speedway World Championship in Bradford, England.
 17 December — Denmark wins bronze at the 1995 World Women's Handball Championship in Hungary after defeating Norway 25–24 in the bronze match.

Births

 11 January – Jakob Blåbjerg, defender playing
 15 January – Andrew Hjulsager, footballer
 29 January – Carlo de Reuver, footballer
 4 February – Pione Sisto, footballer
 27 February – Marcus Solberg, footballer
 3 March – Matthias Asperup, ice hockey player
 9 March – Emiliano Hansen, footballer
 20 April – Jeppe Højbjerg, footballer
 31 May – Anita Madsen, figure skater
 10 April – Oliver Bjorkstrand, ice hockey player
 4 June – Mikkel Wohlgemuth, footballer
 July 6 – Noah Skaalum, singer
 August 4 – Jacob Dehn Andersen, footballer
 August 5 – Pierre-Emile Højbjerg, footballer

Deaths

 28 May - Henning Kronstam, ballet dancer, balletmaster, theatre director (born 1934)
 13 July - Godtfred Kirk Christiansen, Managing Director of The Lego Group from 1957 to 1973 (born 1920)
 Mogens Ellegaard, accordion player

See also
 1995 in Danish television

References

 
Denmark
Years of the 20th century in Denmark
1990s in Denmark